South Hooksett is a census-designated place (CDP) within the town of Hooksett in Merrimack County, New Hampshire, United States. The population was 5,888 at the 2020 census. It is a suburban area adjacent to the city of Manchester, New Hampshire's largest city, and includes a mix of housing developments and large retail stores.

Geography
South Hooksett is located in the southern part of the town of Hooksett (and the southernmost part of Merrimack County) at  (43.030833, -71.434860). It is bordered to the west and south by the city of Manchester in Hillsborough County, to the east by the town of Auburn in Rockingham County, and to the north by Legends Road, Hooksett Road (U.S. Route 3), Londonderry Turnpike (New Hampshire Route 28 Bypass), a line north of Whitehall Road (New Hampshire Route 27), and Farmer Road. The Hooksett portion of the campus of Southern New Hampshire University is within the CDP.

The Merrimack River runs just outside the northwest boundary of the CDP, and the north half of the CDP is drained by Dalton Brook and Messer Brook, west-flowing tributaries of the Merrimack. The southwest corner of the CDP drains south to Dorrs Pond in Manchester, while the southeast part is drained by Neal Brook, a south-flowing tributary of Massabesic Lake. The entire CDP is part of the Merrimack River watershed.

Demographics

As of the census of 2010, there were 5,418 people, 1,765 households, and 1,297 families residing in the CDP. The population density was 1,020.3 people per square mile (394.1/km). There were 1,845 housing units at an average density of 347.5 per square mile (134.2/km). The racial makeup of the CDP was 94.4% White, 1.2% African American, 0.3% Native American, 2.0% Asian, 0.1% Pacific Islander, 0.7% some other race, and 1.5% from two or more races. Hispanic or Latino of any race were 2.0% of the population.

There were 1,765 households, out of which 36.7% had children under the age of 18 living with them, 60.6% were headed by married couples living together, 8.7% had a female householder with no husband present, and 26.5% were non-families. 18.0% of all households were made up of individuals, and 6.8% were someone living alone who was 65 years of age or older. The average household size was 2.69, and the average family size was 3.07.

In the CDP, the population was spread out, with 21.7% under the age of 18, 17.6% from 18 to 24, 23.1% from 25 to 44, 27.3% from 45 to 64, and 10.4% who were 65 years of age or older. The median age was 36.2 years. For every 100 females, there were 93.2 males. For every 100 females age 18 and over, there were 91.5 males.

For the period 2009 through 2013, the estimated median annual income for a household in the CDP was $87,377, and the median income for a family was $105,769. Male full-time workers had a median income of $63,886 versus $44,522 for females. The per capita income for the CDP was $33,319.

References

Census-designated places in Merrimack County, New Hampshire
Census-designated places in New Hampshire
Hooksett, New Hampshire